Vladislav Krivitsky (born 3 July 1995) is a Belarusian professional footballer who plays for Dinamo Brest.

References

External links 
 
 

1995 births
Living people
Belarusian footballers
Association football defenders
Belarusian expatriate footballers
Expatriate footballers in Kazakhstan
FC Minsk players
FC Torpedo Minsk players
FC Granit Mikashevichi players
FC Energetik-BGU Minsk players
FC Kyran players
FC Dynamo Brest players